The Areni-1 winery is an ancient winery that was discovered in 2007 in the Areni-1 cave complex in the village of Areni in the Vayots Dzor province of Armenia by a team of Armenian and Irish archaeologists. The excavations were carried out by Boris Gasparyan of the Institute of Archaeology and Ethnography of the National Academy of Sciences of Armenia  and Ron Pinhasi from University College Cork (Ireland), and were sponsored by the Gfoeller Foundation (USA) and University College Cork. In 2008 the University of California, Los Angeles (UCLA) also joined the project with Gregory Areshian as co-director of the Areni Project. Since then the excavations have been sponsored by UCLA and the National Geographic Society as well. The excavations of the winery were completed in 2010.

The winery consists of fermentation vats, a wine press, storage jars, pottery sherds, and is believed to be at least a thousand years older than the winery unearthed in the West Bank in 1963, which is the second oldest currently known.

The Areni-1 shoe was found in the same cave in 2008.

Discovery
Excavations at the Areni-1 site began in 2007 and continued until September 2010. Armenian, American and Irish archaeologists fully unearthed a large, well-preserved  vat, along with a  basin made of clay and covered with malvidin. In addition to these discoveries, grape seeds, remains of pressed grapes, prunes, walnuts, and desiccated vines were found. A number of drinking cups, found next to a set of ancient graves, were also excavated, suggesting that the site was used for funeral ceremonies and ritualistic practices. The cave was abandoned after its roof caved in, and the organic material was preserved thanks to sheep dung, which prevented fungi from destroying the remains.

The team's full findings will be published in future.

Analysis
The results of the biochemical analysis of the residues from the bottom of the wine-press and the storage jars carried out by Hans Barnard and his colleagues at UCLA were published in the Journal of Archaeological Science in January 2011.

Botanical analysis and radiocarbon tests carried out by researchers at the University of California, Irvine and Oxford University have revealed the date of the Areni-1 winery to around 4100 BC and 4000 BC or the Late Chalcolithic Period. According to Areshian, the vintners used their feet to press the wine in the clay basin, the juice of which would then drain into the vat, where it would remain to ferment until being stored in jars. The capacity of the vat has been estimated to be about 14–15 gallons..

According to Areshian, the discovery of the winery has provided greater insight to the study of horticulture. Patrick E. McGovern, a biomolecular archaeologist at the University of Pennsylvania Museum, has likewise emphasized the importance of the discovery, describing it as "important and unique, because it indicates large-scale wine production, which would imply, I think, that the grape had already been domesticated."

The exact identity of the people who lived in the region at the time is not known, although some researchers have postulated that they may have belonged to the Kura-Araxes people and added that they may have been very involved in trade.

See also
 Gregory Areshian
 Areni-1 shoe
 History of wine
 Armenian wine
 Andin. Armenian Journey Chronicles

Notes

Bibliography
 Areshian G, et al. "The Chalcolithic of the Near East and South-Eastern Europe: Discoveries and New Perspectives from the Cave Complex Areni-1, Armenia," Antiquity 86 (2012):115–130.

External links
The oldest winery and shoe

Chalcolithic sites of Asia
Archaeological artifacts
2007 archaeological discoveries
Archaeological sites in Armenia

Areni
History of wine